Dipterocarpus globosus is a species of tree in the family Dipterocarpaceae endemic to Borneo, where it occurs in Brunei, Sarawak (Malaysia) and Kalimantan (Indonesia).

Range and habitat
Dipterocarpus globusus grows in lowland mixed dipterocarp forest and heath forest up to 500 meters elevation, where it is locally abundant.

References

globosus
Endemic flora of Borneo
Trees of Borneo
Critically endangered flora of Asia
Flora of the Borneo lowland rain forests
Flora of Sarawak
Flora of Kalimantan